The Samuel and Lana Ewing House. at 107 S. 100 East in Smithfield, Utah, is a house with Queen Anne-style features. It was listed on the National Register of Historic Places in 1994.

Built around 1904, it is a one-story frame house upon a somewhat raised stone foundation.

It has a square tower, while round towers with conical roofs are more common in Queen Anne houses.

References

		
National Register of Historic Places in Cache County, Utah
Queen Anne architecture in Utah
Houses completed in 1904